Dessalines wrongly referred to as Marchand-Dessalines, is a commune in the Artibonite department of Haiti. It is named after Jean-Jacques Dessalines, a leader of the Haitian Revolution and the first ruler of independent Haiti. It is known as the First Black Capital of the New World.

History

French Period
During that period L'Éstère city was a major city in the Artibonite Valley. Marchand at that time was a habitation probably belonging to a french name Marchand.

Haitian Period  
During the Haitian revolution, Dessalines organized most of his troops from the town of Petite Riviere de Artibonite. Dessalines asked Pétion to lay a plan for a new city that would become the capital of free Haiti over the habitation Marchand.
In 1804 the town was made the capital of the newly independent state of  Haiti. It was renamed after Jean-Jacques Dessalines in honor of the first Haitian head of state. The imperial constitution of 20 May 1805 was proclaimed from the town of Dessalines. After the emperor's assassination in October 1806 Port-au-Prince was declared the new capital of Haiti.

Geography
The commune lay in the Artibonite Valley, on the north shore of the river at the bottom of the Montagne Noir mountain range.
The major river of the commune is the Estère river.

Economy

Agriculture
Like much of the valley Dessalines' main economical hub is agriculture mainly rice cultivation.

Tourism
Dessalines have great potential for historical and cultural tourism.

Historical Places
 Fort Fin-du-Monde
 Fort Madame
 Fort Doco
 Fort Innocent
 Fort Culbuté
 Fort Décidé
 Kayloa Dessalines
 Bassin Félicité

References

Populated places in Artibonite (department)
Communes of Haiti